Arena rock (also known as AOR, melodic rock, stadium rock, anthem rock, pomp rock, corporate rock and dad rock) is a style of rock music that originated in the mid-1970s. As hard rock bands and those playing a softer yet strident kind of pop rock became increasingly popular, groups began creating material inherently designed for performance to large audiences, and arena rock developed from their use of more commercially oriented and radio-friendly sounds. The often highly produced music, including both upbeat, dramatic songs and slower power ballads, features strong emphasis on melody and frequently employs anthemic choruses. Other major characteristics include prominent guitar effects and the use of keyboard instruments.

Many of the above labels are used pejoratively, and discussions over music criticism often delve into the question of whether musicians' focus on rock spectacle and mass appeal results in compromised artistic merit, particularly in terms of the difference between the interests of the "middlebrow" populace versus other listeners. Interest in arena rock is stereotypically associated with working-class to middle-class men living in either Canada or the United States (including so-called "yuppies"), which has been cited as the basis for condescending prejudice over social status in some criticisms. However, the style of music has been highly successful worldwide, particularly in terms of touring.

Characteristics

Historian Gary A. Donaldson has summed up arena rock as "big hair, big voices, and really big guitars". In contrast to other types of music with a more raw, time-worn approach, arena rock musicians emphasize dramatic production. With bands deliberately designing their material for large audiences, the songs focus on melody, often featuring strident choruses. Guitar effects and the use of keyboard instruments are significant elements of the genre. Fireworks displays, use of smoke, and methods of sophisticated lighting, have become part of the visual aesthetics of what is known as arena rock.

Development and popularity

1960s–1970s
Despite the differences in terms of genre, Beatlemania and the gigantic, screaming crowds that greeted the Beatles as they performed in the U.S. proved influential on arena rock, particularly with artists' complex views of the connection between themselves as musicians and the primal needs of their mass audiences. The rise of the rock style largely signified the end of the hippie-type of idealistic 1960s culture, particularly after the disillusionment that followed the infamous Altamont Free Concert of 1969, and represented a newer form of musical expression that was still confident and strident while also being more commercial. With hundreds of people injured and one dying, said concert has been described as "the spiritual death of the decade".

In the period from the end of the 1960s to the middle of the 1970s, advances in technology allowed for the increased power of amplification and sound systems without losing sound quality, thus giving hard rock bands the opportunity to use larger and larger venues. Attributing the birth of arena rock to the Rolling Stones' 1969 US tour, The Guardian ranked the tour number 19 on their list of the 50 key events in rock music history. Prior to the tour the loudest sound at big-capacity shows was often the crowd, so the Stones ensured they had lighting and sound systems that would allow them to be seen and heard in the biggest arenas, with The Guardian stating their "combination of front-of-house excellence and behind the scenes savvy took the business of touring to an entirely new level."

The Flint, Michigan-born Grand Funk Railroad, which advertised itself as a "people's band" on the release of their 1969 debut album given their nationwide touring, played to about 125,000 in Georgia and 180,000 in Texas within a short period of time. Although hard rock influenced heavy metal music and the arena rock style, they shared an emphasis on loudness, screen vision and formed more heavily sound that had dominated the rock mainstream from late 70s to early 80s.

Bands such as Styx, Boston, Triumph, and Journey were popular arena rock acts of the late 1970s and early 1980s.  

Arena rock's popularity, being described as "a dominant force" musically from the 1970s onward, resulted in a number of musical reactions. The British pub rock movement arose in large part due to its emphasis on small-scale events, aimed at promoting a friendly, intimate connection between performers and audiences. The explosion of punk rock and punk subcultures in general in the 1970s directly challenged the perceived excesses of mainstream rock at the time.

1980s–1990s
The Rock and Roll Hall of Fame states that the following decade, particularly the late 1980s, is "considered a golden era of hard rock in terms of commercial airplay".

The music of the 1970s often reflected changing philosophical interests compared to previous decades, with personal growth, private revelation, and self-improvement gaining more emphasis compared to past interests in collectivist social activism. The period coming to be known dismissively as the "Me Decade", rock releases frequently celebrated a hedonistic, self-indulgent abandonment. Multiple artists also pursued an arena rock sound based on individual inspiration and achievement, particularly in anthemic songs about independence. In terms of the changing trends into the 1980s and onward, the style essentially replaced disco in terms of mass pop culture appeal.

During that period, arena rock evolved in a way that was still melodic and performance-driven yet far more aggressive and confrontational. Mainstream rock became dominated by these hair metal (also known as "glam metal" and "pop metal") bands, with a large emphasis still being put on both on music and visuals. Flashy clothing with elements such as heavy makeup and dramatic hairstyles became common. Prominent examples of this genre include Def Leppard, Mötley Crüe and Poison. Their popularity crashed after the success of alternative rock bands who began to break through into popular consciousness with an even more abrasive sound, particularly artists influenced by the success of Nirvana in the early 1990s.

The website AllMusic has opined that "[o]ld-fashioned hard rock became a scarce commodity in the post-alternative rock era; after grunge, many guitar bands not only adopted a self-consciously serious attitude, but also resisted the urge to write fist-pumping, arena-ready choruses." Multiple artists have continued to play on to cult followings. Bands Bon Jovi and Van Halen in particular achieved significant commercial success into the 1990s.

Critical perspectives
Ethnomusicologist Chris McDonald of Cape Breton University has argued that the label of a musical artist as "arena rock" and "old wave", done by music critics dismissively, originates from a background of classism influenced by modernism. Thus, mass popularity is put forth as an argument against perceived artistic merit, through the eyes of critics focused on high culture while disdaining market forces, particularly given the white, working class to middle class makeup of the fans. Focusing on the Canadian trio Rush, McDonald stated that the panning of the group as "dazzling yet empty" due to the musicians' focus on rock spectacle is a consequence of critics' psychological distance from the "middlebrow" populace that listens to them.

The use of commercial sponsorship for the large-scale tours and concerts of the 1970s, a practice that continues, has caused the music to pick up the pejorative label of being "corporate rock". Writer Chris Smith argued that the style dehumanized listeners, setting them up as passive recipients rather than allowing them to truly engage with musicians, and additionally put different bands in a position akin to homogenized products. It has also been regarded as essentially malign capitalist propaganda. The distance between taste-makers' judgment of certain groups as "uncool" and their mass audience appeal had existed since the style's origins after the ending of the 1960s, and a wide variety of other dismissive terms have been used such as "dad rock".
 
Deliberately playing against criticism and claiming to represent the people against the elite has been used in musical marketing. The association of arena rock with the so-called "yuppies" and their conspicuous consumption additionally has tied the style with a group often maligned in the media, subject to mocking caricatures and other kinds of ridicule. However, as pointed out by historian Gary A. Donaldson, the music eclipsed the waning genre of disco and related bands successfully toured across the world.

See also

1970s in music
List of rock genres
Glam rock
Power pop
Progressive rock
Middlebrow

Notes

References

Citations

Bibliography

20th-century music genres
Rock music genres
1970s in music